Major General W.M. Mensah-Wood was a Ghanaian military personnel and a former Chief of Army Staff of the Ghana Army. He served as Chief of Army Staff from June 1987 – June 1990.

References

  

Ghanaian military personnel
Chiefs of Army Staff (Ghana)